John C. Robinson (born 1959) is an American biologist, environmental advocate, and author. He studied biology at Iowa State University and devoted the rest of his career to becoming a professional ornithologist. He worked for the United States Department of Agriculture (1979-1988) and the United States Fish & Wildlife Service (1988-) and served on the Board of Directors for the American Birding Association. He is the recipient of Audubon's Toyota TogetherGreen fellowship and the author of several ornithology reference books, including Common Birds of Mount Diablo and the North American Bird Reference Book.

As an African American environmentalist, a significant part of his advocacy work is focused on making minorities, in particular minority youth and young adults, more engaged with the environment through bird watching, a topic that he wrote about in his 2008 book Birding for Everyone: Encouraging People of Color to Become Birdwatchers.

References 

Living people
1959 births
African-American educators
21st-century African-American people
20th-century African-American people
Iowa State University alumni
United States Department of Agriculture people
United States Fish and Wildlife Service personnel